is a Japanese Olympic dressage rider. Representing Japan, she competed at the 2016 Summer Olympics in Rio de Janeiro where she finished 50th in the individual and 11th in the team competition.

References

External links
 

Living people
1978 births
Japanese female equestrians
Japanese dressage riders
Equestrians at the 2016 Summer Olympics
Olympic equestrians of Japan
Equestrians at the 2018 Asian Games
Asian Games gold medalists for Japan
Asian Games medalists in equestrian
Medalists at the 2018 Asian Games
21st-century Japanese women